The 2015 Stetson Hatters football team represented Stetson University during the 2015 NCAA Division I FCS football season. They were led by third-year head coach Roger Hughes and played their home games at Spec Martin Stadium. They were a member of the Pioneer Football League. They finished the season 3–8, 1–7 in PFL play to finish in a three-way tie for eighth place.

Schedule

Source: Schedule

Game summaries

Webber International

at Mercer

at Drake

Dayton

at Jacksonville

Campbell

at Valparaiso

San Diego

at Marist

Ave Maria

Davidson

References

Stetson
Stetson Hatters football seasons
Stetson Hatters football